Rumarn Kameron-Scott Burrell (born 16 December 2000) is an English professional footballer who plays as a forward for Scottish League One side Falkirk.

Burrell was initially part of the youth academies of Coventry City and Scunthorpe United before joining Grimsby Town's academy in 2017. He turned professional with Grimsby in 2019 and made four league appearances before signing for EFL Championship side Middlesbrough. He has since spent time on loan with Bradford City and Kilmarnock.

Early life
Burrell was born in Birmingham.

Career

Grimsby Town
Burrell played youth football for Coventry City and Scunthorpe United before joining Grimsby Town's academy in 2017. He made his senior debut on 6 April 2019 in a 2–0 defeat at home to Stevenage, before going on to make a further four League Two appearances for Grimsby Town in the 2018–19 season. He was offered his first professional deal with Grimsby Town in April 2019.

Middlesbrough
He signed for Middlesbrough in summer 2019 for an undisclosed fee on a three-year contract. He made his Middlesbrough debut on 9 January 2021 as a substitute in a 2–1 FA Cup defeat away to Brentford. Burrell joined Bradford City on loan until the end of the season on 14 January 2021. He made two appearances whilst on loan at Bradford City.

On 30 July 2021, it was announced that Burrell had joined Kilmarnock on a season-long loan.

Falkirk
After Burrell's Middlesbrough contract expired in 2022, it was announced that he had signed for Scottish League One side Falkirk on a 1 year contract.

Career statistics

References

2000 births
Living people
English footballers
Footballers from Birmingham, West Midlands
Association football forwards
Grimsby Town F.C. players
Middlesbrough F.C. players
Bradford City A.F.C. players
Kilmarnock F.C. players
English Football League players
Scottish Professional Football League players
Falkirk F.C. players